The William Saroyan International Prize for Writing is a biennial literary award for fiction and nonfiction in the spirit of William Saroyan by emerging writers. It was established by Stanford University Libraries and the William Saroyan Foundation to "encourage new or emerging writers rather than recognize established literary figures;" the prize being $12,500.

The Saroyan Prize was first awarded in 2003 for "newly published works of fiction including novels, short stories, dramas or memoirs." Starting with the second round of awards in 2005, separate awards have been given for fiction and nonfiction. With the exception of a three year gap between the second and third rounds of awards, the prize has been awarded every two years since it was established.

Winners and finalists
2003 :
Everything is Illuminated by Jonathan Safran Foer (winner)
The Impressionist by Hari Kunzru
Nocturne by Adam Rapp
2005 Fiction:
The Laments by George Hagen (winner)
Bloodvine by Aris Janigian
The Calligrapher by Edward Docx
How to Breathe Underwater by Julie Orringer
2005 Non-fiction:
The King of California by Mark Arax and Rick Wartzman (winner)
Chasing the Sea by Tom Bissell
The Children's Blizzard by David Laskin
2008 Fiction:
The History of Love by Nicole Krauss (winner)
The Understory by Pamela Erens
Dead Boys by Richard Lange
2008 Non-fiction:
Dandelion Through the Crack by Kiyo Sato (winner)
Ticket to Exile: A Memoir by Adam David Miller
Return of the Condor by John Moir
2010 Fiction:
Atmospheric Disturbances by Rivka Galchen (winner)
apologize, apologize! by Elizabeth Kelly
Concord, Virginia by Peter Neofotis
2010 Non-fiction:
The King of Vodka by Linda Himelstein (winner)
Trauma Farm by Brian Brett
Aesop's Mirror by Maryalice Huggins
2012 Fiction
 Orientation and Other Stories by Daniel Orozco (winner)
Leaving the Atocha Station by Ben Lerner
East of the West: A Country in Stories by Miroslav Penkov
2012 Non-fiction
 The Sound of a Wild Snail Eating by Elisabeth Tova Bailey (winner)
 Solacers by Arion Golmakani
 Pulphead by John Jeremiah Sullivan
2014 Fiction
 Long Division by Kiese Laymon (winner)
 The Facades by Eric Lundgren
 A Marker to Measure Drift by Alexander Maksik
2014 Non-fiction
 The Riddle of the Labyrinth by Margalit Fox (winner)
 The Boys in the Boat by Daniel James Brown
2016 Fiction
 Welcome to Braggsville by T. Geronimo Johnson (winner)
 Now We Will Be Happy by Amina Gautier
 Counternarratives by John Keene
2016 Non-fiction
 Belief is its Own Kind of Truth, Maybe by Lori Jakiela (winner)
 Russian Tattoo by Elena Gorokhova
 Nagasaki: Life After Nuclear War by Susan Southard
2018 Fiction
 In the Distance by Hernan Diaz (winner)
 The Traders by Scott Shibuya Brown
 Lucky Boy by Shanthi Sekaran
2018 Non-fiction
 On Trails: an Exploration by Robert Moor (winner)
 Riverine: a Memoir from Anywhere but Here by Angela Palm
 Shakespeare in Swahililand: Adventures with the Ever-living Poet by Edward Wilson-Lee
2020 Fiction
 Friday Black by Nana Kwame Adjei-Brenyah (winner)
 The Hundred Wells of Salaga by Ayesha Harruna Attah
 Some Trick: Thirteen Stories by Helen DeWitt
2020 Non-fiction
 Homesick: a Memoir by Jennifer Croft (winner)
 How to Write an Autobiographical Novel: Essays by Alexander Chee
 In the Dream House: a Memoir by Carmen Maria Machado

References

External links
Prize website

American literary awards